The  is a DC electric multiple unit (EMU) type operated by the private railway operator Sagami Railway (Sotetsu) on commuter services in Kanagawa Prefecture, Japan, since 1993.

Formations 
, the fleet consists of seven ten-car sets, numbered 9701 to 9707, formed as shown below with six motored ("M") cars and four non-powered trailer ("T") cars, and car 1 at the Yokohama end.

Unrefurbished sets
The unrefurbished sets are formed as follows.

The motored cars each have one pantograph.

Refurbished sets
The refurbished sets are formed as follows.

The motored cars each have one pantograph.

Interior
Passenger accommodation consists mostly of longitudinal bench seating, but cars 5 and 8 include transverse seating bays.

History 
The trains were built by Tokyu Car Corporation in Yokohama between 1993 and 2001, with the first trains entering service in 1993. A total of 70 cars were built.

From 2011, the fleet was gradually repainted into the new corporate livery, and some sets received single-arm pantographs in place of the original lozenge type.

Set 9701, which wasn't part of the Yokohama Navy Blue refurbishment programme, was scrapped on 11 December 2020.

Refurbishment
From 2016, the 9000 series EMU fleet is scheduled to undergo a programme of refurbishment. This involves new interiors, including leather seat covers on the transverse seating bays, interior lighting that can be adjusted to suit day and night conditions, and a new exterior livery of Yokohama Navy Blue.

References

Electric multiple units of Japan
9000 series
Train-related introductions in 1993
Tokyu Car multiple units
1500 V DC multiple units of Japan